The United Nations Humanitarian Air Service (UNHAS) managed by the World Food Programme (WFP), provides common air services, including light cargo transport for the wider humanitarian community to and from areas of crisis and intervention. In most countries requiring humanitarian assistance, surface travel is impeded by challenging security situations, long distances and poor road conditions. Furthermore, most of the destinations the humanitarian community needs to reach are not served by adequate commercial air operators. When no other means of reaching isolated communities are available, aid workers can rely on UNHAS to provide access.

To fulfill its mission, UNHAS uses a fleet of 75 aircraft and helicopters chartered from commercial air operators that are compliant with the International Civil Aviation Organization (ICAO) Standards and Recommended Practices (SARP) and the United Nations Aviation Standards for Peacekeeping and Humanitarian Air Transport Operations (UNAVSTADS).

Chartered aircraft are fully dedicated to UNHAS operations. Therefore, contracted air carriers are assured of revenue in terms of guaranteed aircraft utilization for the duration of the contract. This, along with UNHAS' efficient management of schedules, ensures that partner air carriers avoid taking undue risks to achieve financial gains. For example, in the event of a flight cancellation due to poor weather conditions, the air carrier would not be financially penalized.

UNHAS operations
In 2021 UNHAS provided passenger and light cargo services in 23 countries

Afghanistan
Burkina Faso
Cameroon
Central African Republic
Chad
Democratic Republic of the Congo 
Equatorial Guinea 
Ethiopia
Guinea
Haiti
Kenya
Libya
Madagascar
Mali
Mauritania
Mozambique
Niger
Nigeria
Somalia
South Sudan
Sudan
Syrian Arab Republic
Yemen

Fleet 

To fulfil its mission, UNHAS uses a fleet of 75 aircraft, of which 59 are fixed-wing aircraft and 16 are rotary-wing aircraft.

Performance
In 2021, UNHAS transported 325,112 passengers alongside 5,862 mt of humanitarian cargo and food to 496 destinations (including ad hoc) in 23 countries. Additionally, 3,015 evacuations were carried out during this year, including security relocations, medical evacuations (including those of COVID-19).

Funding
WFP/UNHAS is funded by contributions from donors and money realized from a partial cost recovery scheme through which passengers pay ticket fees for the air service.

The UNHAS donors in 2021 were: Canada, Czech Republic, Denmark, the European Union, France, Germany, Ireland, Italy, Japan, Korea, Luxembourg, Monaco, Norway, Qatar, Romania, Spain, Sweden, Switzerland, the United Kingdom, UNICEF, the United States, the United Nations itself and Private Donors.

References

External links 

United Nations Humanitarian Air Service (UNHAS) Annual Review 2021
United Nations Humanitarian Response Depot, Brindisi
United Nations historic fleet at Planespotters.net

World Food Programme